The following outline is provided as an overview of and topical guide to Niger:

Niger – landlocked sovereign country located in West Africa.  Niger was named for the Niger River.  It borders Nigeria and Benin to the south, Burkina Faso and Mali to the west, Algeria and Libya to the north and Chad to the east. The capital city is Niamey.

General reference 

 Pronunciation:  or 
 Common English country name:  Niger
 Official English country name:  The Republic of Niger
 Common endonym(s):  
 Official endonym(s):  
 Adjectival(s): Nigerien
 Demonym(s):
 ISO country codes:  NE, NER, 562
 ISO region codes:  See ISO 3166-2:NE
 Internet country code top-level domain:  .ne

Geography of Niger 

Geography of Niger
 Niger is: a landlocked country
 Population of Niger: 14,226,000  - 64th most populous country
 Area of Niger: 1,267,000 km2
 Atlas of Niger

Location 
 Niger is situated within the following regions:
 Northern Hemisphere and Eastern Hemisphere
 Africa
 North Africa
 partially within the Sahara Desert
 Time zone:  West Africa Time (UTC+01)
 Extreme points of Niger
 High:  Mont Idoukal-n-Taghès 
 Low:  Niger River 
 Land boundaries:  5,697 km
 1,497 km
 1,175 km
 956 km
 821 km
 628 km
 354 km
 266 km
 Coastline:  none

Environment of Niger 

 Climate of Niger
 Renewable energy in Niger
 Kandadji Dam
 Protected areas of Niger
 National parks of Niger
W National Park
 Wildlife of Niger
 Fauna of Niger
 Birds of Niger
 Mammals of Niger

Natural geographic features of Niger 

 Glaciers in Niger: none 
 Islands of Niger
 Lété Island
 Mountains of Niger
Aïr Mountains
Djado Plateau
 Rivers of Niger
Niger River
 World Heritage Sites in Niger

Regions of Niger 

Regions of Niger
Arbre du Ténéré
Azawagh
Gadoufaoua
Talak
Ténéré

Ecoregions of Niger 

List of ecoregions in Niger
Azawagh and Ayr region

Administrative divisions of Niger 

Administrative divisions of Niger
 Regions of Niger
 Departments of Niger
 Communes of Niger

Regions of Niger 

Regions of Niger
Agadez Region
Diffa Region
Dosso Region
Maradi Region
Tahoua Region
Tillabéri Region
Zinder Region

Departments of Niger 

Departments of Niger

Communes of Niger 

Communes of Niger

Municipalities of Niger 

 Capital of Niger: Niamey
 Cities in Niger
Abalak
Agadez
Arlit
Assamakka
Assodé
Ayourou
Bilma
Birni N'Gaouré
Birni-N'Konni
Dakoro
Diffa
Dogondoutchi
Dosso
Galmi
Gaya
In-Gall
Madaoua
Maradi
Mayahi
Miria
N'guigmi
Niamey
Ourofan
Say
Tahoua
Tchin-Tabaraden
Téra
Tessaoua
Tillabéri
Jikata
Tillabéri
Timia
Zinder

Demography of Niger 

Demographics of Niger

Government and politics of Niger 

Politics of Niger
 Form of government: semi-presidential representative democratic republic
 Capital of Niger: Niamey
 Elections in Niger
 Political parties in Niger

Branches of the government of Niger 

Government of Niger

Executive branch of the government of Niger 
 Head of state: President of Niger, Mahamadou Issoufou
 Head of government: Prime Minister of Niger, Brigi Rafini
 Council of Ministers of Niger

Legislative branch of the government of Niger 

 Parliament of Niger (unicameral)

Judicial branch of the government of Niger 

Court system of Niger
 Supreme Court of Niger

Foreign relations of Niger 

Foreign relations of Niger
 Diplomatic missions in Niger
 Diplomatic missions of Niger

International organization membership 
The Republic of Niger is a member of:

African, Caribbean, and Pacific Group of States (ACP)
African Development Bank Group (AfDB)
African Union (AU)
Conference des Ministres des Finances des Pays de la Zone Franc (FZ)
Council of the Entente (Entente)
Economic Community of West African States (ECOWAS)
Food and Agriculture Organization (FAO)
Group of 77 (G77)
International Atomic Energy Agency (IAEA)
International Bank for Reconstruction and Development (IBRD)
International Civil Aviation Organization (ICAO)
International Criminal Court (ICCt)
International Criminal Police Organization (Interpol)
International Development Association (IDA)
International Federation of Red Cross and Red Crescent Societies (IFRCS)
International Finance Corporation (IFC)
International Fund for Agricultural Development (IFAD)
International Labour Organization (ILO)
International Monetary Fund (IMF)
International Olympic Committee (IOC)
International Organization for Migration (IOM)
International Red Cross and Red Crescent Movement (ICRM)
International Telecommunication Union (ITU)
International Telecommunications Satellite Organization (ITSO)
International Trade Union Confederation (ITUC)

Inter-Parliamentary Union (IPU)
Islamic Development Bank (IDB)
Nonaligned Movement (NAM)
Organisation internationale de la Francophonie (OIF)
Organisation of Islamic Cooperation (OIC)
Organisation for the Prohibition of Chemical Weapons (OPCW)
United Nations (UN)
United Nations Conference on Trade and Development (UNCTAD)
United Nations Educational, Scientific, and Cultural Organization (UNESCO)
United Nations Industrial Development Organization (UNIDO)
United Nations Mission in Liberia (UNMIL)
United Nations Operation in Cote d'Ivoire (UNOCI)
United Nations Organization Mission in the Democratic Republic of the Congo (MONUC)
Universal Postal Union (UPU)
West African Development Bank (WADB) (regional)
West African Economic and Monetary Union (WAEMU)
World Confederation of Labour (WCL)
World Customs Organization (WCO)
World Federation of Trade Unions (WFTU)
World Health Organization (WHO)
World Intellectual Property Organization (WIPO)
World Meteorological Organization (WMO)
World Tourism Organization (UNWTO)
World Trade Organization (WTO)

Law and order in Niger 

Law of Niger
 Constitution of Niger
 Human rights in Niger
 LGBT rights in Niger
 Law enforcement in Niger

Military of Niger 

Military of Niger
 Command
 Commander-in-chief: President of Niger
 Forces
 Army of Niger
 Navy of Niger: None
 Air Force of Niger

Local government in Niger 

Local government in Niger

History of Niger 

History of Niger
 2005-06 Niger food crisis
 Niger uranium forgeries
 Upper Senegal and Niger
 French West Africa
 Senegambia and Niger
 UTA Flight 772
 Nigerien presidential election, 1999
 Nigerien presidential election, 2004

Culture of Niger 

Culture of Niger
 Cuisine of Niger
 Media in Niger
 National symbols of Niger
 Coat of arms of Niger
 Flag of Niger
 National anthem of Niger
 Public holidays in Niger
 Association des Scouts du Niger
 World Heritage Sites in Niger

Art in Niger 
 Cinema of Niger
 Music of Niger
 Nigerien hip hop

Languages of Niger 
 Languages of Niger
 Tuareg languages
 Songhay languages
 Hausa language
 Fula language
 Kanuri language
 Hassānīya
 Tayart Tamajeq
 Zarma language

People of Niger 

People of Niger

Ethnic groups 
 Djerma
 Fula people
 Hausa people
 Songhai people
 Tuareg
 Wodaabe
 Yerwa Kanuri
 Kanuri people

Notable individuals

 Souley Abdoulaye
 Semira Adamu
 Boukary Adji
 Ismaël Alassane
 Hamid Algabid
 Hama Amadou
 Djibo Bakary
 Amadou Cheiffou
 Amadou Cissé
 Andrée Clair
 Mano Dayak
 Hamani Diori
 Mahamadou Issoufou
 Seyni Kountché
 Aliou Mahamidou
 Tandja Mamadou
 Ibrahim Baré Maïnassara
 Ibrahim Hassane Mayaki
 Aïchatou Mindaoudou
 Mohammed Muyei
 Ide Oumarou
 Mamane Oumarou
 Mahamane Ousmane
 Nassirou Sabo
 Ali Saibou
 Ibrahim Tankary
 Daouda Malam Wanké
 Ilguilas Weila
 Moussa Yahaya

Religion in Niger 
Religion in Niger
 Buddhism in Niger
 Christianity in Niger
 Roman Catholicism in Niger
 Diocese of Niamey
 Hinduism in Niger
 Islam in Niger

Sports in Niger 

Sports in Niger
 Football in Niger
 Niger at the Olympics

Economy and infrastructure of Niger 

Economy of Niger
 Economic rank, by nominal GDP (2007): 140th (one hundred and fortieth)
 Agriculture in Niger
 Banking in Niger
 Central Bank of West African States
 Communications in Niger
 Internet in Niger
 Companies of Niger
Currency of Niger: Franc
ISO 4217: XOF
 Energy in Niger
 Power Stations in Niger
 Health care in Niger
 Mining in Niger
 Prostitution in Niger
 Stock Exchange in Niger: none – Niger is served by the regional stock exchange Bourse Régionale des Valeurs Mobilières (BRVM) in Abidjan, Cote d'Ivoire.
 Transport in Niger
 Airports in Niger
 Diori Hamani International Airport
 Zinder Airport
 Rail transport in Niger

Education in Niger 

Education in Niger
 Abdou Moumouni University
 Islamic University of Niger
 University of Maradi
 Universite de Tahoua
 University of Zinder

Health in Niger 

Health in Niger

See also 

Niger
List of international rankings
List of Niger-related topics
Member state of the United Nations
Outline of Africa
Outline of geography
 Cure Salee
 Kel Ayr
 La Nigérienne
 Lycée La Fontaine (Niger)
 Mamar Kassey
 Sahel Academy
 Yamma Mosque
 AfricaPhonebook
 Annuaires Afrique
 Galmi Hospital
 Societe Semafo

References

External links 

Government
Niger Assemblee Nationale official site
Mission of Niger to the United Nations official site

News
International
Nigerportal - Niger Web portal on Niger in French. ( News, pictures, information about Niger and culture...)
IRIN News - Niger Humanitarian news and analysis
allAfrica - Niger news headline links
Nigerdiaspora - Niger network for the Niger diaspora worldwide
Infos Niger for exchanging information about Niger both in French and English

Domestic publications
 Le Républicain-Niger Daily

Overviews
BBC News Country Profile - Niger
CIA World Factbook - Niger

US State Department - Niger includes Background Notes, Country Commercial Guides and major reports

Tourism

 Ministry of Tourism. Official website — Includes comprehensive information on Tourism in Niger

Other
 Aid to Niger
 Map of Niger with departements
 Maps of Niger, pictures of Agadez, Tuaregs and handcraft from Niger
 Anti-slavery.org page on slavery in Niger

Niger